Call My Name may refer to:
Call My Name (album), by Etta James, 1967
Call My Name (EP), by Got7, 2019
"Call My Name" (Orchestral Manoeuvres in the Dark song), 1991
"Call My Name" (Prince song), 2004
"Call My Name" (Charlotte Church song), 2005
"Call My Name" (Third Day song), 2008
"Call My Name" (Pietro Lombardi song), 2011
"Call My Name" (Cheryl song), 2012
"Call My Name" (AverySunshine song), 2014
"Call My Name" (The Brilliant Green song), 1999
"Call My Name" (Tove Styrke song), 2011
"Call My Name", single and album by James Royal, 1967 and 1969
"Call My Name", a song by Night Ranger from Dawn Patrol, 1982
"Call My Name", a song by Michael Bolton from Everybody's Crazy, 1985
"Call My Name", a song by Sammy Hagar from The Essential Red Collection, 2004
"Call My Name", a song by Sultan & Ned Shepard (featuring Nadia Ali), 2011
"Call My Name", a song by Jars of Clay from The Shelter, 2010